Ana Brenda Contreras (born 24 December 1986), also known as Ana Breco, is an American actress, singer and model. From 2010 to 2011, she played Aurora Alcázar in the telenovela Teresa. From 2018 to 2019, Contreras starred as Cristal Jennings in The CW's series Dynasty, a reboot of the 1980s series of the same name.

Life and career

1986–2014: Early life and career
Contreras was born in McAllen, Texas, on 24 December 1986, to Blanca Pérez and Efrain Contreras Puente. Contreras is of Mexican descent and speaks both English and Spanish. She moved to Mexico City in 2002 at age 15 to join the reality show Pop Stars, in which she was a finalist and member of a group, T'detila, who released an album with the same name. In 2003, she took acting classes in the Televisa's Centro de Educación Artística (CEA) in Mexico City.

In 2005, Contreras portrayed Juanita Sánchez in her debut telenovela, Barrera de amor. In 2006, she participated in a production of Grease. That same year, Contreras played Claudia in the telenovela Duelo de Pasiones. In 2008, she starred in the film Divina Confusion, directed by Salvador Garcini. From 2008 to 2009, Ana also starred as Violeta Madrigal in the telenovela Juro que te amo. In 2009, she played Maura Albarrán in the telenovela Sortilegio. That same year, she appeared as Marcela Garrido in an episode of the TV series Mujeres asesinas and had a special participation in the original Fox series, Tiempo final.

From 2010 to 2011, Contreras played the lead role of Aurora Alcázar on Teresa. She also played Carol in the musical Timbiriche. Contreras later starred in the telenovela La que no podía amar as Ana Paula Carmona from 2011 to 2012.

In 2013, she portrayed Maricruz Olivarez in the telenovela Corazón indomable, a remake of Marimar which achieved international success. In 2014, Contreras appeared in the Mexican film Volando bajo, directed by Beto Gómez. That same year, she was host of the Premios Juventud. In 2015, Contreras played the lead role of Verónica Prado Castelo in the telenovela Lo imperdonable. She sang "Como perdonar", the telenovela's theme, on the soundtrack.

2015–present: Further acting
In 2015, she also starred in the movie Tunnel 19. Contreras starred as Goyita Vera in Blue Demon in 2016, and as Alejandra Ponce in Por amar sin ley in 2018.

From 2018 to 2019, Contreras starred as Cristal Jennings in the second season of The CW's prime time soap opera reboot, Dynasty, in her first English language role.

Personal life
Contreras married Alejandro Amaya in a civil ceremony in Las Vegas on April 4, 2013. On May 14, 2014, she sent a press release announcing the permanent separation from him.

Filmography

Film roles

Television roles

Awards and nominations

Premios Diosas de Plata

Premios ACPT

TVyNovelas Awards

Premios Juventud

People en Español

References

External links

Ana Brenda's Biography  in esmas.

1986 births
Living people
Actresses from Texas
American actresses of Mexican descent
American television actresses
American emigrants to Mexico
Actresses from Tamaulipas
Mexican telenovela actresses
Mexican film actresses
Mexican stage actresses
People from McAllen, Texas
21st-century Mexican actresses
21st-century Mexican singers
21st-century Mexican women singers
21st-century American actresses